The hot chocolate effect is a phenomenon of wave mechanics in which the pitch heard from tapping a cup of hot liquid rises after the addition of a soluble powder. It was first documented in 1980 by Frank Crawford of the Lawrence Berkeley Laboratory. It was initially observed in the making of hot chocolate or instant coffee, but also occurs in other situations such as adding salt to supersaturated hot water or cold beer. Recent research has found many more substances which create the effect, even in initially non-supersaturated liquids. The effect is thought to happen because upon initial stirring, entrained gas bubbles reduce the speed of sound in the liquid, lowering the frequency. As the bubbles clear, sound travels faster in the liquid and the frequency increases.

The effect can be observed by pouring hot milk or hot water into a mug, stirring in chocolate powder, and tapping the bottom of the mug with a spoon. The pitch of the taps will increase progressively with no relation to the speed or force of tapping. Subsequent stirring of the same solution (without adding more chocolate powder) will gradually decrease the pitch again, followed by another increase. This process can be repeated a number of times, until equilibrium has been reached. Musical effects can be achieved by varying the strength and timing of the stirring action along with the timing of the tapping action.

Origin of the phenomenon 
The phenomenon is explained by the effect of bubble density on the speed of sound in the liquid. The note heard is the frequency of a standing wave where a quarter wavelength is the distance between the base of the mug and the liquid surface. This frequency f is equal to the speed v of the wave divided by four times the height of the water column h:

The speed of sound v in a homogeneous liquid or gas is dependent on the fluid's mass density and adiabatic bulk modulus, according to the Newton-Laplace formula:

Water is approximately 800 times denser than air, and air is approximately 15,000 times more compressible than water. (Compressibility is the inverse of the bulk modulus .) When water is filled with air bubbles, the fluid's density is still very close to the density of water, but the compressibility will be the compressibility of air. This greatly reduces the speed of sound in the liquid. Wavelength is constant for a given volume of fluid; therefore the frequency (pitch) of the sound will decrease as long as gas bubbles are present.

Different rates of bubble formation will generate different acoustic profiles, allowing differentiation of the added solutes.

See also
Broadband acoustic resonance dissolution spectroscopy, a spectroscopic technique that uses the Hot Chocolate Effect as its fundamental principle.

References

External links
Sound of a Cup With and Without Instant Coffee: A Foam-Filled Acoustics Demonstration  Andrew Morrison and Thomas D. Rossing, 143rd ASA Meeting, Pittsburgh.
A video demonstration of the Hot Chocolate Effect

Wave mechanics
Acoustics
Physics experiments